Chalarus orientalis is a species of fly in the family Pipunculidae.

Distribution
Myanmar.

References

Pipunculidae
Insects described in 1985
Diptera of Asia